Hellpits of Nightfang is a 1979 fantasy role-playing game adventure published by Judges Guild for RuneQuest.

Contents
Hellpits of Nightfang is a 32 page adventure in which the player characters must defeat a vampire residing nearby the grave of a legendary hero.

Reception
Forrest Johnson reviewed Hellpits of Nightfang in The Space Gamer No. 32. Johnson commented that "It is not easy to find fault with this supplement [...] A good little adventure, easily worth [the price]."

Notes

References

Judges Guild RuneQuest adventures
Role-playing game supplements introduced in 1979
RuneQuest 2nd edition supplements